Astoria High School is the only public high school located in Astoria, Oregon serving grades 9th–12th. It is located on the edge of Youngs Bay, on the south side of town. The school's mascot is the Fighting Fisherman as a tribute to a past primary economy source in the area. Astoria High School provides classes that integrate the students in the local environment and job force, with a high percentage of graduates working career in the fishing, forestry and lumber markets.

Academics
Of the students enrolled at Astoria High School, 41% are economically disadvantaged, 13% are students with disabilities, and 6% are identified as English Language Learners. After a record low number of graduation rates, Astoria Senior High School is currently celebrating its fourth year of its highest graduation rates, currently at 75%. Astoria High School utilizes community partnerships, special programs such as the Life Skills Consortium, Alternative Education, Upward Bound and Talent Search programs, and a committed staff to create an environment of academic and athletic achievement. 
Astoria High School provides a number of supports to help ensure student success:
 116 minutes of instructional tutorials embedded into the school week. 
 After school math and writing labs to provide enrichment and academic support in those studies, offered throughout the school year. 
 A "Senior Mentor" program in which community partners work individually with 12th grade students who could benefit from additional adult supports and guidance. 
 Advisory program, which assigns every student a certified staff member to serve as an advisor whom they will work with for the four years of high school.

As of the 2014–2015 school year, Astoria High School reported the following racial demographics: 
 American Indian/Alaska Native 1%
 Asian 1%
 Black/African American 2%
 Hispanic/Latino 14%
 MultiRacial 4%
 Native Hawaiian/Pacific Islander 0%
 White 78%

Community based and extracurricular clubs
Astoria High School supports 16 clubs: FFA, Debate, Japanese Society, Astor Post, Net Shed, Women's Choir, National Honors Society, Business Leaders of Tomorrow, Souls in School, Thespians, Key Club and Communicare, Spanish, French, Mu Alpha Theta, National Honors Society, Zephrus.

Recently, the Astoria High School Art Department, under the leadership of Mickey Cereghino, has participated in fundraisers and public art projects benefiting the community as well as global organizations such as Medical Teams International and the Ecole Classique Bon Samaritain school located in Arcahaie, Haiti.

Athletics
The Astoria High School Athletics department celebrates the following state titles:
 Girls' track and field: 1981, 2015, 2016, 2017
 Dance: 1991, 1993, 2005, 2015
 Girls' golf: 1977
 Football: 2008
 Boys’ Cross Country: 1990, 1992
 Boys' basketball: 1930, 1932, 1934, 1935, 1941, 1942, 1998
 Baseball: 2006, 2009, 2011

Notable alumni
 Maila Nurmi, actress and television personality who created the 1950s character Vampira. Class of 1940.
Jordan Poyer, is an American football free safety for the Buffalo Bills of the National Football League. Class of 2009.

References

High schools in Clatsop County, Oregon
Buildings and structures in Astoria, Oregon
Public high schools in Oregon